The Directorate General for National Security ( (also DGNS, Sûreté nationale, or Sûreté) is the  national civil police force of Algeria. It polices Algeria's larger cities and urban areas. The Sûreté is part of the Ministry of Interior and is charged with maintaining law and order, protecting life and property, investigating crimes, and apprehending offenders. It also performs other routine police functions, including traffic control.

Organization 

The DGNS is headed by a Director General and in 2007 consisted of a force of 130,000, including specialist operational and investigative branches and supporting services.

The judicial police branch is responsible for criminal investigations, working in close coordination with the Office of the Public Prosecutor in the Ministry of Justice. Police are assigned to the capitals of the wilayat are under the nominal control of the individual governors. A special riot police force is equipped with modern riot-control gear. Although the police were able to cope with urban disturbances and violence during the early and mid-1980s, the military had to be called in to help quell the severe riots in late 1988.

Internal security

Elements of the DGNS nationale also play a role in countering threats to the government arising from political subversion. The Sûreté assigns police contingents to work with customs inspectors at legal points of entry to control illegal activities. Their main concerns are apprehending undesirable immigrants and contraband traffickers. The Département du Renseignement et de la Sécurité (DRS) is the Algerian state intelligence service. It is separate from Directorate General for National Security and was an active player in the Algerian Civil War of the 1990s.

Weapons 
Glock 17
Beretta 92
Caracal pistol
Smith & Wesson M&P
AKM
Beretta M12
HK MP5

Vehicles

Motorcycles 

 BMW K1100RT
 BMW R1100RT
 BMW K1600GT

Cars

Special vehicles 
 BCL M-5
 Nimr (armored personnel carrier)

Aerial equipment 
 AgustaWestland AW109
 Eurocopter AS350 Écureuil

See also 
 Sûreté
 Law enforcement in Algeria
 Garde communale

References

Notes

Law enforcement in Algeria
National Central Bureaus of Interpol